Daud Abdihakim Omar is a Somali politician. He is the State Minister of National Security of Somalia, having been appointed to the position on 17 January 2014 by Prime Minister Abdiweli Sheikh Ahmed.

References

Living people
Government ministers of Somalia
Place of birth missing (living people)
Year of birth missing (living people)